Arthur Gilbert Johnson (February 15, 1897 – June 7, 1982) was a pitcher in Major League Baseball. He played one game for the New York Giants in 1927.

References

External links

1897 births
1982 deaths
Major League Baseball pitchers
New York Giants (NL) players
Baseball players from Pennsylvania
People from Warren, Pennsylvania